Brian James Esposito (born February 24, 1979) is an American minor league baseball manager and former professional baseball catcher who appeared in three games in the Major Leagues in brief stints with the St. Louis Cardinals and Houston Astros.

Playing career

Amateur
Esposito played college baseball for the University of Connecticut, and in 1999 he played collegiate summer baseball with the Orleans Cardinals of the Cape Cod Baseball League. He was selected by the Boston Red Sox in the 5th round of the 2000 MLB Draft.

Professional
Esposito was recalled from the Memphis Redbirds on May 30, when the Cardinals' starting catcher, Yadier Molina, was placed on the disabled list with a fractured wrist. Esposito made his major league debut June 2 against the Houston Astros as a late-inning defensive replacement for Gary Bennett.  He did not have a plate appearance. He returned to Memphis on June 5 after the Cardinals acquired veteran catcher Kelly Stinnett from the Los Angeles Dodgers. In , he played for the Double-A Tulsa Drillers in the Colorado Rockies organization and became a free agent at the end of the season.

Esposito signed a minor league contract with the Astros on January 14, and was invited to spring training.

Esposito would join Houston roster in 2010 when they expanded their roster in September.  He would get two plate appearances on September 18, 2010 against the Cincinnati Reds when he was a late inning replacement for Jason Castro. He was also called up June 24, 2011, but sent back down June 29 without an appearance. On October 10, he elected free agency.

On December 23, 2011, Esposito signed a minor league deal with the Cincinnati Reds with an invitation to spring training.

On May 20, 2012 he was signed to a minor league deal by the Chicago Cubs and sent down to their Triple-A affiliate, the Iowa Cubs.

In March 2013, Esposito signed with the Pittsburgh Pirates as a player-coach.

Coaching career
In his first year, he led the 2018 Indians to a 73–67 win–loss record, bringing his career managerial mark to 306–262 (.539) over five years. 

He had spent  as pilot of the Pirates' Class A Short Season farm team, the West Virginia Black Bears. He previously managed the Pirates Class A affiliate, the West Virginia Power of the South Atlantic League. In 2014, he served as the last manager in the franchise history of the Jamestown Jammers.

At the end of the 2021 baseball season, his contract was not renewed by the Pittsburgh Pirates. In seven seasons as a minor league manager with the Pirates, he posted a 433-401 record.
In December 2021 it was announced that Esposito had joined the Padres organization. 
|url=https://www.mlb.com/news/pirates-announce-changes-to-coaching-staff

References

9.  mlb.com (December 16, 2021) "Changes to Coaching Staff" https://www.mlb.com/news/pirates-announce-changes-to-coaching-staff

External links

1979 births
Living people
Augusta GreenJackets players
Baseball players from New York (state)
UConn Huskies baseball players
Corpus Christi Hooks players
Frisco RoughRiders players
Houston Astros players
Indianapolis Indians managers
Iowa Cubs players
Lowell Spinners players
Major League Baseball catchers
Memphis Redbirds players
Oklahoma City RedHawks players
Oklahoma RedHawks players
Orleans Firebirds players
Provo Angels players
Rancho Cucamonga Quakes players
Round Rock Express players
St. Louis Cardinals players
Sarasota Red Sox players
Stockton Ports players
Tulsa Drillers players